Baptist Park School, located in Taylor, Michigan, USA, was a private Christian school that opened in 1974 and closed in 2016 due to declining enrollment.  The school was founded by the Gilead Baptist Church. Baptist Park school offered classes from preschool through twelfth grade. It was a private, co-educational school, which stressed Baptist religious principles.

In 2007–08 there were 213 students.

References

External links
 

Baptist schools in the United States
Christian schools in Michigan
Defunct Christian schools in the United States
Educational institutions established in 1974
Schools in Wayne County, Michigan
Private K-12 schools in Michigan
Taylor, Michigan